Éva Pajor (16 September 1937 – 19 December 2014) was a Hungarian swimmer. She competed in the women's 100 metre backstroke at the 1956 Summer Olympics in Melbourne. Following the Olympics, she sought asylum in Australia, becoming a swimming teacher in Sydney. She later opened two swimming centres in the country, and a swimming centre in Penrith, New South Wales was named after her.

References

External links
 

1937 births
2014 deaths
Olympic swimmers of Hungary
Swimmers at the 1956 Summer Olympics
Swimmers from Budapest
Hungarian female backstroke swimmers
20th-century Hungarian women
21st-century Hungarian women
Hungarian emigrants to Australia
Hungarian refugees